The Gentle Storm is a Dutch musical project by singer and lyricist Anneke van Giersbergen and composer and musician Arjen Anthony Lucassen, founder and leader of other musical projects such as Star One, Ayreon, Guilt Machine and Ambeon. The duo has previously collaborated in Ayreon albums Into the Electric Castle and 01011001. The project's debut album, The Diary, was released on March 23, 2015 in Europe, and the following day in the US.

History

Formation and The Diary (2014–2016) 
The project was unveiled on 22 April 2014 and was described by Lucassen as "an epic double concept album, a combination of 'classical meets metal' and 'acoustic folk'." Lucassen's most recurrent collaborator Ed Warby will be featured once again on drums, and it will be his very first album featuring a double bass among the instruments. He confirmed that Johan van Stratum from his former band Stream of Passion would play bass on the album. Also, due to "unforeseen problems", Warby had to re-record all his drum parts in one day only. Other former collaborators will be back, such as Joost van den Broek (piano), Ben Mathot (violin) and Maaike Peterse (cello), along with two new guest instrumentalists: Hinse Mutter (double bass) and Jenneke de Jonge (French horn).

On September 2, 2014, Lucassen revealed that his collaboration with van Giersbergen was actually a new band, called The Gentle Storm. He stated that van Giersbergen would perform live with band next year, possibly ruling himself out of live shows.

On October 10, it was announced at The Gentle Storm's official Facebook profile that the album would be composed of two CDs with the same songs, but recorded in totally different arrangements. CD 1 will be "the 'Gentle' album, [...] all acoustic and folky with lots of exotic instruments", while CD2 will be "the 'Storm' album, [...] an all-out, bombastic orchestral metal album". The post also stated that there would be "plenty of progressive elements mixed in". The post invited fans to ask questions, and some of the answers revealed that the album is set for a March 2015 release, that the band will probably continue if the public reception is good enough and that the concept will be "a historic love-story". On 4 November, the album was revealed to be titled The Diary, with a cover art by Alexandra V. Bach, who also drew the art of A War of Our Own by Stream of Passion, another band started by Arjen, but that continued after he left it.

On January 20, 2015, the project released two lyric videos for both versions of the song "Endless Sea".

The Gentle Storm did a small-scale tour in April 2016, after which Lucassen and Van Giersbergen focused on other projects, including together in the Ayreon Universe series of concerts. Van Giersbergen subsequently created the band VUUR, mostly with live members of The Gentle Storm.

Personnel 

 Anneke van Giersbergen (ex-The Gathering) - lead vocals
 Arjen Anthony Lucassen (Ayreon, Ambeon, Star One, Guilt Machine, ex-Stream of Passion) - guitars, keyboards, percussion, hammered dulcimer

Additional musicians
 Ed Warby (Gorefest) - drums
 Rob Snijders (Agua de Annique) - percussion
 Johan van Stratum (Stream of Passion) - bass
 Joost van den Broek (Star One, After Forever) - piano
 Timo Somers (Delain, Vengeance) - guitar solo on "Heart of Amsterdam"
 Ben Mathot - violin
 Hinse Mutter - double bass
 Maaike Peterse - cello
 Jenneke de Jonge - French horn
 Jeroen Goossens - wind instruments
 Jack Pisters - sitar and coral
 Micheal Mills - Irish bouzouki
 Remco Helbers - surbahar
 Nathanael van Zuilen - tabla
 "Epic Rock Choir" - choir

Live lineup
 Anneke van Giersbergen - vocals
 Ferry Duijsens (Agua de Annique) - guitars
 Merel Bechtold (Delain, MaYaN, Purest of Pain) - guitars
 Johan van Stratum (Stream of Passion)- bass
 Marcela Bovio (Stream of Passion) - backing vocal
 Joost van den Broek - keyboards
 Ed Warby - drums
 Arjen Anthony Lucassen - acoustic guitar (only on a few dates)
 Ruud Jolie (Within Temptation, Maiden UniteD, For All We Know) - Guitars (during South American tour)
 Koen Herfst - drums (during South American tour)

Discography 
 Studio albums
 The Diary (2015)

 EPs
 The Gentle Storm Exclusive Tour CD (2015)

References 

Arjen Anthony Lucassen
Musical groups established in 2014
Heavy metal supergroups
Dutch progressive metal musical groups
2014 establishments in the Netherlands
Dutch musical duos
Dutch folk music groups